The Wild Pair may refer to:

 The Wild Pair (film), a 1987 American film
 The Wild Pair (duo), a singing duo